Vayne is a surname. Notable people with the surname include:

Jan Vayne (born 1966), Dutch pianist
Ian Vayne (born 1962), Australian Opera Singer
Kyra Vayne (1916–2001), Russian-born British opera singer

See also
Vayne Solidor, character in the video game Final Fantasy XII
Shauna Vayne, the Night Hunter, a playable champion character in the multiplayer online battle arena video game League of Legends